Boris Alekseyevich Stukalov (born 24 January 1953) is a Russian professional football manager and a former player.

Personal
His son Aleksei Stukalov is a professional football manager as well.

External links
 

1953 births
Living people
Soviet footballers
FC Dynamo Stavropol players
Russian football managers
FC Dynamo Stavropol managers
Russian expatriate football managers
Expatriate football managers in Ukraine
FC Kairat managers
FC Tom Tomsk managers
Russian Premier League managers
FC Spartak Vladikavkaz managers
FC Ural Yekaterinburg managers
FC Arsenal Tula managers
FC Sibir Novosibirsk managers
FC Sibir Novosibirsk players
Association football midfielders